Chanot is a village in Hansi -1 tehsil of Hisar district, in the Indian state of  Haryana. The majority is of Duhan Clan of Jaat caste. 

The village is named after Dadi Chaini Devi Chahal, an elder who was its first inhabitant, initially Daughter of Mahjot village. She was married in Sagban village in Duhan family. For an unknown reason, she came to the place where the present Chanot lies. Chanot is in the Hansi constituency of the Haryana legislature and the Hisar constituency in the Lok Sabha (Parliamentary) system.

Services 
The village hosts a Dispensary, Tuition Center, Common Service Center, Ration Distribution Center, SBI Kiosk Center, Veterinary Hospital, Community Center, Marriage Place, various Chapels, Patwari office, BSNL exchange, streetlights, paved streets, electricity complaint center, and markets.

Transport 
The village is connected to neighboring villages by roads, bus routes, and a public health tanker with boosting pumps. A petrol pump is available. A playground with a statue of former President of the Indian National Congress , Netaji Subhash Chandra Bose. 

Shree DaiyaRam was the first Nambardar of the village.

Geography
Chanot is located in State Highway No. 17 (Hansi - Barwala road).

Chanot is surrounded by Tehsil Hansi to the south, Barwala Tehsil to the north, Narnaund Tehsil to the east, and Hisar-II Tehsil to the west.

Nearby villages 
 Bhatla – 4 kilometers (2.49 miles)
 Kharkari – 5 kilometers (3.11 miles)
 Khokha – 4 kilometers (2.49 miles)
 Kulana – 6 kilometers (3.73 miles)
 Singhwa Ragho – 6  kilometers (3.73 miles)
 Masoodpur – 6 kilometers (3.73 miles)
 Sindhar – 7  kilometers (4.35 miles)
 South – Hansi (12 kilometers), west – Hisar (22 kilometers), north –  Barwala (18 kilometers), east – Jind (42 kilometers) are the nearby cities.

Ponds (Talab) (Lohad) 
 Panjrukha (named after five trees) (Sanskrit word panch+rukha).
 Dada Chauvala (named after Dada chuhe wala). It is universally called BADA JOHAD (The Big Pond).
 Johari (Dada Silga's Pond)
 Kumhar Khadde
 Dobhi.

List of Sarpanch (Head of Panchayat) 
The incumbent Sarpanch of the village is Shree Rammehar Shobharam Singh Duhan, who has held the position since 2016. The Sarpanch and the Panchayat were elected by the villagers on 5 January 2016.

Former Sarpanch:

 Sh. Shambhudatt Sharma (first Sarpanch of Chanot)
 Smt. Sajjna Satyawan Duhan (2010-2016)
 Indra Devi W/O Rajpal Singh (2005-2010) (RESERVED)
 Master Jagdish Singh Duhan (2000-2005)
 Jaibir Singh Duhan (1995-2000)
 Advocate Ved Prakash
 Chandagi Ram Duhan
 Randhir singh duhan
 Daleep Singh Duhan
 Sudha Ram Duhan

Education
 Aryavart Sr. Sec. School: established in 2003
 Government High School, Chanot.
 Lalji Ram Memorial High School (LRM), Chanot, established in 1997.
 Adarsh High School, Chanot, was established in 2009.
 Kiran Public School, Chanot.

Places of worship

Temples 
 Dada Khera
 Baba Satgar Ji Maharaj (The True Teacher)
 Baba Lal Das Ji Maharaj (Saladerry Dham Wale)
 Baba Atvaar Puri Ji Maharaj
 Baba Bajrang Bali And Lord Shiva

References

External list 
 
 
 
 
 
 
 

 Villages in Hisar district